The Grammy Award for Best Male R&B Vocal Performance was awarded between 1968 and 2011.  The award has had several minor name changes:

In 1968 it was awarded as Best R&B Solo Vocal Performance, Male
From 1969 to 1994 it was awarded as Best R&B Vocal Performance, Male
Since 1995 it has been awarded as Best Male R&B Vocal Performance

The award category was discontinued in 2012 as part of a major overhaul of the Grammy categories. It was merged with Best Female R&B Vocal Performance and Best R&B Performance by a Duo or Group with Vocals into a single category for Best R&B Performance.

Years reflect the year in which the Grammy Awards were presented, for works released in the previous year.

Recipients

Category records
Most wins

Most nominations

References

External links 
 Official Site of the Grammy Awards

Male RandB Vocal Performance
Grammy Awards for rhythm and blues